The 2016 Internazionali di Tennis Città di Vicenza was a professional tennis tournament played on clay courts. It was the third edition of the tournament which was part of the 2016 ATP Challenger Tour. It took place in Vicenza, Italy between 21 and 29 May May 2016.

Singles main-draw entrants

Seeds

 1 Rankings are as of May 16, 2015.

Other entrants
The following players received wildcards into the singles main draw:
  Francisco Bahamonde
  Lorenzo Sonego
  Matteo Donati
  Edoardo Eremin

The following players received entry into the singles main draw as special exempt:
  Joris De Loore

The following players entered the singles main draw with a protected ranking:
  Julian Reister

The following player entered as an alternate:
  Filippo Volandri

The following players received entry from the qualifying draw:
  Tomislav Brkić
  Viktor Galović
  Stefano Napolitano
  Pere Riba

Champions

Singles

 Guido Andreozzi def.  Pere Riba, 6–0, ret.

Doubles

 Andrey Golubev /  Nikola Mektić def.  Gastão Elias /  Fabrício Neis, 6–3, 6–3

External links
 Tournament website

Internazionali di Tennis Citta di Vicenza
Internazionali di Tennis Città di Vicenza
AON